QwaQwa was a bantustan ("homeland") in the central eastern part of South Africa. Its capital was Witsieshoek. It was the designated homeland of more than 180,000 Sesotho-speaking Basotho people.

The frequent snow on the Drakensberg mountain peaks led the San to call the region "Qwa-Qwa" (whiter than white). In Afrikaans it was known as "Witsieshoek", after Oetse (also Witsie and Wetsi), a Makholokoe chief who lived there from 1839 to 1856.

Three tribes lived in the region, the Makholokoe, Bakoena and the Batlokoa. In 1969 they were united and the area was named "KwaKwa". In the same year, the name was changed to "QwaQwa" to avoid an ethnic identification.

History

On 1 November 1974 QwaQwa was granted self-government, with Tsiame Kenneth Mopeli as Chief Minister. Mopeli would serve as Chief Minister throughout QwaQwa's existence.

After 27 April 1994 QwaQwa was dissolved, following the first South African democratic election and reunited with Orange Free State. It is now part of the Free State province, with Witsieshoek serving as the seat of Maluti a Phofung Local Municipality.

The municipality also comprises the towns of Harrismith and Kestell. Together they have a combined population of 385 413, of which about 80% lives in the former QwaQwa. The population is divided as follows: 98.09% Black; White 1.68%; Coloured 0.09% and Asian and/or Indian 0.13%.

The place was also a major educational centre in the old apartheid days, with at least 80% of schools in the present Free State province having teachers that were educated in the former homeland. It has a fully functional university but its teachers' colleges have been turned into FETs (Further Education and Training) colleges. The university was called "Uniqwa" under the University of the North before 1994 but has then been incorporated into the University of the Free State (UFS) and renamed "UFS QwaQwa Campus".

The bantustan of QwaQwa had only one district in 1991, Witsieshoek, with a population of 342,886.

See also 
 Chief Ministers of QwaQwa

References 

 
1994 disestablishments in South Africa
Bantustans in South Africa
States and territories established in 1974
1974 establishments in South Africa
States and territories disestablished in 1994
Former republics